The 2010 Maryland gubernatorial election was held on November 2, 2010. The date included the election of the governor, lieutenant governor, and all members of the Maryland General Assembly. Incumbent Democratic governor Martin O'Malley and lieutenant governor Anthony Brown won reelection to a second term in office, defeating Republican former governor Bob Ehrlich and his running mate Mary Kane. Ehrlich had previously lost reelection to O'Malley in 2006. O'Malley and Brown became the first gubernatorial ticket in Maryland history to receive more than one million votes.

As of 2022, this is the most recent gubernatorial election in which the Democratic nominee was not an African American.

Democratic primary

Candidates
J. P. Cusick
Running mate: Michael Lange
Ralph Jaffe, teacher and perennial candidate
Running mate: Freda Jaffe
Martin O'Malley, incumbent governor
Running mate: Anthony Brown, incumbent lieutenant governor

Results

Republican primary

Candidates
Bob Ehrlich, former governor 
Running mate: Mary Kane, former Maryland Secretary of State
Brian Murphy, businessman
Running mate: Mike Ryman, former federal and congressional inspector and candidate for the State Senate in 2006
Former running mate: Carmen Amedori, former State Delegate

Results

Minor party candidates

Constitution Party
Eric Delano Knowles
Running mate: Michael Hargadon

Green Party
Maria Allwine
Running mate: Ken Eidel

Libertarian Party
Susan Gaztanaga
Running mate: Doug McNeil

General election

Predictions

Polling

Results

Republican voter suppression
In the summer before the election, Ehrlich's campaign hired a consultant who advised that "the first and most desired outcome is voter suppression", in the form of having "African-American voters stay home." To that end, the Republicans placed thousands of Election Day robocalls to Democratic voters, telling them that O'Malley had won, although in fact the polls were still open for some two more hours. The Republicans' call, worded to seem as if it came from Democrats, told the voters, "Relax. Everything's fine. The only thing left is to watch it on TV tonight." The calls reached 112,000 voters in majority-African American areas. In 2011, Ehrlich's campaign manager, Paul Schurick, was convicted of fraud and other charges because of the calls. Ehrlich denied knowing about the calls.

See also
2010 Maryland General Assembly election

References

External links
Maryland State Board of Elections 
Maryland Governor Candidates at Project Vote Smart
Campaign contributions for 2010 Maryland Governor from Follow the Money
Maryland Governor 2010 from OurCampaigns.com
2010 Maryland Governor General Election: Bob Ehrlich (R) vs Martin O'Malley (D) graph of multiple polls from Pollster.com
Election 2010: Maryland Governor from Rasmussen Reports
2010 Maryland Governor – Ehrlich vs. O'Malley from Real Clear Politics
2010 Maryland Governor's Race from CQ Politics
Race Profile in The New York Times
Candidate blogs  at The Baltimore Sun
Official campaign websites (Archived)
 Bob Ehrlich for Maryland
 Martin O'Malley for Governor

Gubernatorial
2010
Maryland
Martin O'Malley